Rev. Hiram Collins Haydn (December 11, 1831 – July, 31, 1913) was an American minister and the fifth President of Western Reserve University, now Case Western Reserve University.

Biography
Haydn was born in Pompey, New York, December 11, 1831.

He graduated from Amherst College in 1856 and Union Theological Seminary in 1859.  He was pastor of the First Presbyterian Church (Old Stone Church) on Public Square in Cleveland from 1872–1880 and 1884–1902.  

While president at Western Reserve from 1897–1890, he most notably ended coeducation, instead creating a coordinate system solution, establishing the College for Women, later named Flora Stone Mather College.

Wrote "The History of Presbyterianism in Cleveland," published in 1893 by Winn and Judson, and wrote much of "Annals of the First Presbyterian Church of Cleveland, 1820-1895," in 1895, also published by Winn and Judson. 

Haydn died in Cleveland on July 31, 1913, and was buried at Lake View Cemetery.

References

External links
 Case Western Reserve University bio 
 

1831 births
1913 deaths
Burials at Lake View Cemetery, Cleveland
Case Western Reserve University faculty
People from Pompey, New York
Amherst College alumni
Presidents of Case Western Reserve University